Edward Gordon Reeve (born 3 December 1947) was an English professional football midfielder and manager who played in the Football League for Brentford.

Playing career

Brentford 
Reeve began his career in the youth team at Third Division club Brentford. Just over a week after turning 18, he made his debut for the club in a 2–0 defeat to Mansfield Town on 11 December 1965. A disastrous 1965–66 season saw the Bees relegated to the Fourth Division for 1966–67 and Reeve broke through into the team, making 22 appearances. He made just two appearances during the 1967–68 season before his departure. Reeve made 26 appearances in all competitions for Brentford.

Lincoln City (loan) 
Due to financial problems at Brentford causing the reserve team to be folded, Reeve departed to gain further experience at fellow Fourth Division club Lincoln City, but failed to make an appearance.

Los Angeles Wolves 
Reeve moved to the United States in 1968 to join Los Angeles Wolves for the inaugural season of the North American Soccer League.

Non-league football 
Reeve returned to England in 1969 and played in non-league football for Hillingdon Borough, Enfield, Hounslow and Woking. He was awarded a testimonial by Hillingdon Borough in 1975.

Managerial career 
Reeve managed Southern League South Division club Hounslow in the early 1980s.

Personal life 
Reeve's brother Geoff was also a footballer and signed a schoolboy contract with Brentford in September 1966.

Honours 
Enfield
 Isthmian League First Division: 1976–77

Career statistics

References

1947 births
Living people
Footballers from Hounslow
English footballers
Brentford F.C. players
English Football League players
Los Angeles Wolves players
Enfield F.C. players
Hounslow F.C. players
Woking F.C. players
Lincoln City F.C. players
Hounslow F.C. managers
Southern Football League players
Isthmian League players
Association football midfielders
Association football inside forwards
North American Soccer League (1968–1984) players
Hillingdon Borough F.C. players
English expatriate sportspeople in the United States
Expatriate soccer players in the United States
English expatriate footballers
English football managers